Jung Joon-won (born January 13, 1988) is a South Korean actor. He is known for his role as Kook Jong-bok in the television series My Lawyer, Mr. Jo 2: Crime and Punishment.

Filmography

Film

Television series

Awards and nominations

References

External links
 
 

1988 births
Living people
South Korean male television actors
South Korean male film actors
Seoul Institute of the Arts alumni